Lake Agassiz was a large glacial lake in central North America. Fed by glacial meltwater at the end of the last glacial period, its area was larger than all of the modern Great Lakes combined.

First postulated in 1823 by William H. Keating, it was named by Warren Upham in 1879 after Louis Agassiz, when Upham recognized that the lake was formed by glacial action.

Geological progression
During the last ice age, northern North America was covered by an ice sheet, which alternately advanced and retreated with variations in the climate. This continental ice sheet formed during the period now known as the Wisconsin glaciation, and covered much of central North America between 30,000 and 10,000 years ago. As the ice sheet disintegrated, its meltwaters created an immense proglacial lake.

Around 13,000 years ago, this lake came to cover much of what are now southeastern Manitoba, northwestern Ontario, northern Minnesota, eastern North Dakota, and Saskatchewan.

At times the lake drained south through the Traverse Gap into Glacial River Warren (parent to the Minnesota River, a tributary of the Mississippi River), east through Lake Kelvin (modern Lake Nipigon) to what is now Lake Superior, and northwest through the Clearwater Spillway to the Mackenzie River System and the Arctic Ocean about 13,000 years ago.

The ice returned to the south for a time, but as it again retreated north of the present Canada–United States border around 10,000 years ago, Lake Agassiz refilled. The last major shift in drainage occurred around 8,200 years ago. The melting of remaining Hudson Bay ice caused Lake Agassiz to drain nearly completely. This final drainage of Lake Agassiz has been associated with an estimated  rise in global sea levels.

Lake Agassiz's major drainage reorganization events were of such magnitudes that they significantly impacted climate, sea level, and possibly early human civilization. The lake's enormous freshwater release into the Arctic Ocean has been postulated to have disrupted oceanic circulation and caused temporary cooling. The draining of 13,000 years ago may be the cause of the Younger Dryas stadial.  Although disputed, the draining at 9,900–10,000 years ago may be the cause of the 8,200 yr climate event. A study by Turney and Brown links the 8,500-years-ago drainage to the expansion of agriculture from east to west across Europe; they suggest that this may also account for various flood myths of prehistoric cultures, including the Biblical flood narrative.

Glacial River Warren outlet

The lowest point between the drainage of Hudson Bay and the Gulf of Mexico is in the Traverse Gap between the U.S. states of Minnesota and South Dakota. It lies between Lake Traverse and Big Stone Lake. When Lake Agassiz existed, the gap was the outlet to River Warren. The outflow from the melting glaciers filled Lake Agassiz and then drained through the gap to the Gulf of Mexico. Today, this valley contains the Minnesota River, joined by the Upper Mississippi River at Fort Snelling, Minnesota.

North of the gap, the Red River of the North flows from Lake Traverse north through the former lakebed of Lake Agassiz to Lake Winnipeg.

Phases
In this section, YBP denotes years before present.

Lockhart Phase: 12,875–12,560 YBP
During the Lockhart Phase, water accumulated in the Red River valley of North Dakota and Minnesota. As the water reached to the top of the divide to the south, the water drained into the ancestral Minnesota and Mississippi River systems. This occurred while the Laurentian Ice Sheet was at or below the current Canada–US border. As the ice sheet melted northward, an early Lake Agassiz covered southern Manitoba, the Minnesota and Ontario boundary country, and along the Red River south of Fargo, North Dakota. The Lockhart Phase is associated with the Herman lake stage, the highest shoreline of Lake Agassiz. The Big Stone Moraine formed the southern boundary of the lake.

Moorhead Phase: 12,560–11,690 YBP
As the ice sheet melted northward, Lake Agassiz found a lower outlet through the Kaministikwia route along the modern Minnesota–Ontario border. This moved water to Lake Duluth, a proglacial lake in the Lake Superior basin. From there the water drained south via an ancestral St. Croix and Mississippi River systems. The lake drained below the Herman lake beaches until isostatic rebound and glacial advances closed the Kaministikwia route. This stabilized the lake at the Norcross lake stage. Drainage from Lake Agassiz continued to flow southward out of the ancient Minnesota and Mississippi River systems into the Gulf of Mexico.

Emerson Phase: 11,690–10,630 YBP
During the Emerson Phase, lake levels and drainage patterns continually fluctuated. The lake switched from a southward outlet to a northwestern outlet, and may have been static without a significant outlet during this phase. Isostatic rebound changed the elevation of the land, and this, combined with changes in the volume of meltwater from the ice margin and the closure of the Kaministikwia outlet in the east increased the size of the northern end of the lake. One hypothesis postulates that the lake was a ‘terminal lake’ with water inflows and evapotranspiration being equal. Dating of the glacial moraines shows that the Clearwater and Athabasca River system and Lake Nipigon and Minong basin were still ice-covered. A period of precipitation and meltwater input balance with the rate of evapotranspiration may have existed for a short period of time. During this phase, the Clearwater and Athabasca River system outlet opened. Isostatic rebound opened the southern outlet for a time, creating the Norcross, Tintah, and Upper Campbell beaches. The south outlet was permanently closed at the end of Emerson Phase.

Nipigon Phase: 10,630–9,160 YBP
The opening of the Kaministiquia outlet to the east initiated the onset of the Nipigon Phase. The lower lake level ended the southern outlet through the ancestral Minnesota and Mississippi River systems.  The ice sheets advanced and blocked the northwestern outlet through the Clearwater and Athabasca systems. There were several other low level outlets into the Lake Minong basin, including the Kaministiquia and the Lake Nipigon outlet. These allowed large amounts of water to flow from Lake Agassiz into Lake Minong. A series of ice advances and retreats between 10,500 and 9,500 YBP blocked the Lake Nipigon outlet and the other low level outlets, creating intermittent catastrophic outbursts of water into the Lake Minong basin.

These large inflows of water raised Lake Minong lake levels and flowed into Lake Algonquin in the Lake Michigan and Huron basins. These outbursts refilled the Lake Michigan and Huron basins, which are extreme low water levels of Lake Chippewa (Lake Michigan basin) and Lake Stanley (Lake Huron basin). This was due to isostatic rebound of the northern shorelines combined with the opening of the North Bay outlet of the Lake Huron basin. These repetitive outbursts from Lake Agassiz flooded the Lake Minong basin, then flowed over into the Lake Stanley basin, and then flowed through the North Bay drainage route into the Champlain Sea (present day St. Lawrence lowland). The shifting ice sheet created fluctuating drainage channels into the Lake Nipigon and Superior basins. A dozen beaches were created during short periods of stability. Towards the end of the Nipigon Phase, Lake Agassiz reached its largest geographical size as it joined with Lake Ojibway in the east.

Ojibway Phase: 9,160–8,480 YBP

The Ojibway Phase is named for the glacial lake along the ice front in northern Ontario. Lake Ojibway merged with Lake Agassiz at this time. Isostatic rebound of glaciated lands that were south of the ice sheet created a long linear lake from the Saskatchewan–Manitoba border to Quebec. Lake Agassiz-Ojibway drainage raised sea levels. The results can be seen in Nova Scotia, New Brunswick, and eastern Maine. Marine records from the North Atlantic have identified two separate episodes, linked to northern hemisphere cooling in 8,490 YBP and 8,340–8,180 YBP. These may be linked with the Ojibway Phase of Lake Agassiz and may indicate large amounts of drainage from the Ottawa River valley and the Tyrrell Sea (ancestral Hudson Bay).

The Laurentide Ice Sheet continued to recede. Continued warming shrank the ice front towards present day Hudson Bay. Here, the Lake Agassiz northward outlet drained into the Tyrrell Sea. This breach dropped the water level below the eastern Kinojevis outlet. The drainage was followed by the disintegration of the adjacent ice front at about 8,480 YBP. This brought on the end of Lake Agassiz. The ice sheet continued its northward retreat to Baffin Island, leaving the North American mainland around 5,000 YBP.

Lakes of the Lake Agassiz basin
Numerous lakes have formed in this glacial lake basin. The best known are the Great Lakes of Manitoba; Lake Winnipeg, Lake Manitoba, and Lake Winnipegosis. A cluster of smaller lakes surround these, including: Cedar Lake, through which the Saskatchewan River flows; Lake Dauphin, south of Lake Winnipegosis and tributary to it; and Lake St. Martin, on the Fairford or Little Saskatchewan River, the outlet of lakes Manitoba and Winnipegosis. In northern Minnesota, there are Roseau, Thief, Mud, and Maple lakes, besides three large lakes of that state, Rainy Lake, the Lake of the Woods, and Red Lake.

Glacial lakes draining into Lake Agassiz
Glacial Lake Souris formed along the Manitoba and North Dakota border, forming a crescent around the west side of the Turtle Mountains. Lake Souris had three successive outlets: the Sheyenne River, the Pembina River, and finally the Assiniboine River. Initially, Lake Souris' southern bay drained into the Sheyenne River, a tributary of the Red River, which in turn flowed into Lake Agassiz. From this elbow, the lake's waters flowed southeast and entered the Pembina River, now a tributary of the Red River, and the Pembina, in turn, entered Lake Agassiz at its Assiniboine embayment. When the ice sheet retreated north of the Assiniboine River, Lake Souris drained via that river into Lake Agassiz. (Pelican Lake in Langs Valley of Manitoba occupies what was once the northern shore of Lake Souris.)

The lower part of the Saskatchewan River basin near the river's mouth at Cedar Lake was clear of the ice-sheet before Lake Agassiz began to drain to northeast. A few miles east of Lake Saskatchewan's outlet, near the modern junction of the north and south branches, it entered Lake Agassiz. This Saskatchewan embayment extended for  along the modern Saskatchewan River route.

Formation of beaches
Raised beaches, many kilometres from any water, mark the former boundaries of the lake. While the Red River gradually descends from south to north, these old strandlines ascend as one goes north, due to isostatic rebound since glaciation.

When Lake Agassiz outflowed to the south
The highest shore of Lake Agassiz is called the Herman Beach. It is named for Herman, Minnesota, in Grant County. The Herman Beach is the highest shoreline and can be traced from the historic outlet at Lake Traverse on the border of Minnesota and South Dakota. This was the south outlet of Lake Agassiz.

The Herman Beach displays numerous deltas from the major rivers that entered Lake Agassiz. In Minnesota and North Dakota, these include the Buffalo River Delta, Sand Hill River Delta, Sheyenne River Delta, Elk Valley Delta, and the Pembina River Delta. In Manitoba, there is the Assiniboine River Delta.
 Beaches of the Norcross stages: The Norcross shoreline lies near the Herman shore on the slope of eroded till.
 Beaches of the Campbell Stage: These have a well developed profile and are useful in establishing the boundary of the lake when it ceased to flow south into the River Warren.

When Lake Agassiz outflowed to the northeast
Fourteen shorelines of Lake Agassiz have been identified, which lie below the McCauleyville beaches. These formed when the River Warren could no longer receive the outflow of the lake. This occurred when a lower outlet was found and the lake shrank with the release of the lake's waters. The three highest shorelines are named the Blanchard beaches, and the next five in descending order are the Hillsboro, the two Emerado, and the two Ojata beaches, from towns on or near their course in North Dakota.

 Beaches of the Blanchard Stage (Hillsboro Beach): Three successive levels of the lake pass near Blanchard, North Dakota.
Its southern tip is across the Red River between Kragnes, Minnesota, and Harwood, North Dakota. This single shoreline, clearly shows that it belongs to a period when the lake flowed northeastward to its outlet. Crustal rebound was greater to the north, where the Emerado Beach, in Manitoba, is  higher.
Some of the shore is marked by a beach ridge, especially to the north, where the surface is till.
 Burnside Beach: The Burnside Beach crosses the Red River at Grand Forks, North Dakota, and to the northeast, then north, paralleling the Red River   to the east. This beach is indistinct south of the international border.
 Ossowa Beach: The Ossowa Beach lies only a few miles south of the international boundary.
 Stonewall Beach: In Stonewall, Manitoba, there is a conspicuous beach ridge  or more. Beach deposits belonging to this stage were not observed elsewhere in southern Manitoba. It is believed that they are buried for most of their length from the U.S. side of the border, north to Winnipeg
Beginning near Niverville station, it extends southeasterly at least a mile.

Soils
The fertile soils of the Red River Valley, now drained by the Red River of the North, were formed from lacustrine deposits of silt from Lake Agassiz.

See also

 Glacial history of Minnesota 
 Glacial lake outburst flood
 Lake Algonquin 
 Lake Chicago
 Lake Maumee
 Lake McConnell
 List of prehistoric lakes

References

Sources
 
 
 
  
 Pielou, E. C. (1991). After the Ice Age: The Return of Life to Glaciated North America, Chicago: University of Chicago Press, 
 Thorleifson, L.H. (1996).  "Review of Lake Agassiz History",  Sedimentology, Geomorphology, and History of the Central Lake Agassiz Basin, Geological Association of Canada Field Trip Guidebook for GAC/MAC Joint Annual Meeting, pp. 55–84.
   Archived at:  Wayback Machine

External links

Articles
 Bergh, Thor K., "Minnesota’s Sandy Soils", The Conservation Volunteer, Minnesota Department of Conservation. September October 1944, pp. 29–33.
 Coleman, Arthur Philemon, (1909), "Lake Ojibway; Last of the Great Glacial Lakes", in Eighteenth Report of the Ontario Bureau of Mines, pp. 284–293. Retrieved 14 December 2022.

Maps
 
 
 

Glacial lakes of the United States
Glacial lakes of Canada
Lakes of Manitoba
Lakes of Ontario
Lakes of Saskatchewan
Shrunken lakes
Geology of Manitoba
Geology of Minnesota
Geology of Saskatchewan
Geology of North Dakota
Lakes of the Mississippi River
Paleogeography
Proglacial lakes
agassiz
Geology of Ontario
Lakes of North Dakota
Megafloods
Glacial lakes of Manitoba